

Central government

Supreme head of state

Hirohito, Emperor of Japan: supreme Commander in Chief of Armed Imperial Forces, head of state, and representative of the "Imperial Sun Lineage", State Shinto and Worship national god image, and chief of the Imperial Household Ministry.

President of the Imperial Council

Yoshimichi Hara: President of the "Imperial Council" and "Imperial Throne Council of War" also the Emperor's representatives

Chairman of the Imperial Advisory Council
Kantarō Suzuki: Chairman of the Imperial Advisory Council

Imperial family members
The following were closely involved in the government and military of Japan:

Prince Asaka Yasuhiko
Prince Chichibu
Prince Fushimi Hiroyasu
Prince Fushimi Hiroyoshi
Prince Mikasa
Prince Nashimoto Morimasa
Prince Higashikuni Naruhiko
Prince Higashikuni Morihiro
Prince Takamatsu
Prince Takeda Tsuneyoshi
Prince Kan'in Kotohito
Prince Kan'in Haruhito
Prince Kaya Tsunenori
Prince Kitashirakawa Naruhisa
Prince Kitashirakawa Nagahisa
Prince Kuni Asaakira
Prince Yamashina Takehiko
Prince Yi Un (Crown Prince of Korea)

Vice Chairman of the Councilors of Court
Kantarō Suzuki: Vice-chairman of the Councilors of Court

Prime Ministers
Senjuro Hayashi: Prime Minister, Commander-in-Chief of Kwantung Army, Minister of War, member of Imperial Privy Council amongst political adviser in Taisei Yokusankai
Kōki Hirota: Prime Minister, also chief of secret services in the Black Dragon Society
Fumimaro Konoe: Prime Minister; in his second term organized the Tonarigumi organization, Nation Service Society official government syndicate, and Taisei Yokusankai (Imperial Rule Assistance Association) group amongst official expert of Jews affairs
Hiranuma Kiichirō: General in Imperial Forces, Prime Minister, Home Affairs and Justice Minister, chief of Keishicho Police forces, Minister without Portfolio, founder and leader in Shintoist Rites Research Council amongst Last President of Imperial Privy Council
Nobuyuki Abe: Imperial Army General, Prime Minister, member of Imperial Privy Council, political adviser in militarist Genro grouping and last Governor in Chosen
Mitsumasa Yonai:Imperial Navy Admiral, Prime Minister, Minister of Marine, Chief of War Relief Association, expert in Jews topics amongst Imperial and Supreme War Councillor
Hideki Tōjō: Prime Minister, Home Affairs Minister, Education Minister, Trade Minister, War Minister, Head of Kodoha Party; also Commander-in-Chief of Japanese Imperial Forces in same period, also led the Keishicho (Tokyo Metropolitan Police Department); also was for some time head of the Munitions Ministry.
Koiso Kuniaki: Prime Minister and head of Ministry of Greater East Asia (Japan), Vice-Minister of War, also commander of the Imperial Volunteer Corps defensive organization
Kantarō Suzuki: Imperial Navy Admiral, Marine Minister, Military Councillor, Grand Chamberlain and Privy Councilor, later Prime Minister
Prince Higashikuni Naruhiko: Prime Minister, Staff Officer, Army General Staff Headquarters, Military Councilor, Chief of the Army Aeronautical Department, and Commander-in-Chief of the Home Defense Headquarters

Chief Cabinet Secretary
Kenji Tomita: Chief Cabinet Secretary in Minister Konoe period

Military Secretary to Prime Minister
Makoto Matsutani: Military Secretary to Prime Minister

Lord Keeper of the Privy Seal

Makino Nobuaki (30 March 1925 – 26 February 1935)
Saitō Makoto (26 February 1935 – 26 February 1936)
Ichiki Kitokuro (6 March 1936 – 6 March 1936)
Yuasa Kurahei (6 March 1936 – 1 June 1940)
Kōichi Kido (1 June 1940 – 24 November 1945)

Imperial Privy Council

President of Privy Council
Yoshimichi Hara: President of Privy Council
Hiranuma Kiichirō: Last President of Privy Council

Privy Councillors
Jirō Minami: Privy Councillor
Kantarō Suzuki: Privy Councillor
Nobuyuki Abe: Privy Councillor
Hiranuma Kiichirō: Privy Councillor
Senjuro Hayashi: Privy Councillor
Shigeru Honjō: Privy Councillor
Hideki Tōjō: Privy Councilor

Imperial State Council
Sadao Araki: State Councillor

Imperial Aide to the Crown Prince
Takeji Nara: Imperial Aide to the Kōtaishi (Crown Prince)

Military Aide-de-Camp

Shigeru Hasunuma: Chief Aide-de-Camp to the Emperor
Takeji Nara: Chief Aide-de Camp to the Emperor
Kazumoto Machijiri: Aide-de-Camp to the Emperor
Shunroku Hata: Senior Aide-de-Camp to the Emperor
Korechika Anami: Aide-de-Camp to the Emperor
Shigeru Honjō: Aide-de-Camp to the Emperor
Hakaru Yano: Aide-de-Camp to the Emperor
Yoshikazu Nishi: Aide-de-Camp to the Emperor
Tasuku Okada: Aide-de-Camp to Prince Kotohito Kanin
Masaharu Homma: Aide-de-Camp to Prince Yasuhito Chichibu
Takushiro Hattori: Aide-de-Camp/Adjutant to Field Marshal (Prince) Nashimoto
Shoichi Muranaka: Aide-de-camp of Commander Komatsubara during Nomonhan Incident

Grand Chamberlain

Makoto Saito: Grand Chamberlain in period of Imperial Colors Incident
Kantarō Suzuki: Grand Chamberlain
Saburo Hyakutake: Grand Chamberlain
Hisanoru Fujita: Grand Chamberlain

House of Representatives

Juji Kasai: member of House of Representatives of Japan (government supporter)
Kingoro Hashimoto: member in House of Representatives of Japan, defender of official policies

House of Peers

Satō Tetsutarō: Member in House of Peers
Aisuke Kabayama: Member of House of Peers (partner of government policies in first stages)
Teiichi Suzuki: Imperial candidate to House of Peers
Kenkichi Yoshizawa: Member of House of Peers
Prince Higashikuni Morihiro: Member in House of Peers
Nobuyuki Abe: Member in House of Peers
Naoki Hoshino: Member in House of Peers

Imperial Supreme War Command (1937-1945)
Supreme Commander-in-Chief of Armed Imperial Forces
Emperor Hirohito: Supreme Commander-in-Chief of the Imperial Japanese Army and the Imperial Japanese Navy (Article XI of the Meiji Constitution of 1889).

He also led the Imperial Supreme War Council conferences and meetings, in some cases a member of the Imperial Family was sent to represent him at such strategic conferences.

Imperial General Headquarters (Dai Honei)
Established in 1937

Commander
Emperor Shōwa

Minister of War
Hajime Sugiyama : War minister
Seishirō Itagaki : War minister
Shunroku Hata : War minister
Hideki Tōjō: War Minister
Korechika Anami: War Minister

Japanese Army Strategic Thought Group
Strike North Group - Strategist thought group dominated by the Imperial Japanese Army

Aide to War Minister, IGHQ
Joichiro Sanada: Aide to War Minister, IGHQ

Staff officer IGHQ
Torashirō Kawabe: Army Staff officer, IGHQ
Prince Mikasa: Army Staff officer, IGHQ
Okikatsu Arao: concurrently Army Staff Officer, IGHQ
Takushiro Hattori: Army Staff Officer, IGHQ
Keiji Suzuki: Army Staff officer IGHQ

Operations Bureau's Organization and Mobilization Section, IGHQ 
Saburo Hayashi: Chief of Operations Bureau's Organization and Mobilization Section, IGHQ
Seijun Inada: Chief of Operations Bureau's Organization and Mobilization Section, IGHQ

Russian Section of Intelligence Department, IGHQ
Saburo Hayashi: Chief of Russian Section of Intelligence Department, IGHQ

Army Inner Liaison (Army Section), Military Affairs Bureau, Army Ministry, IGHQ
Masao Inaba:Army inner liaison (Army Section), Military Affairs Bureau, Army Ministry, IGHQ

Imperial Japanese Army General Staff (Tokyo HQ)
Prince Kan'in Kotohito: Chief of Army General Staff
Hajime Sugiyama: Chief of Army General Staff
Hideki Tōjō: Chief of Army General Staff
Yoshijirō Umezu: Chief of Army General Staff

Army Zone Commands

Army Regional Commands

Army Tactical Commands

General Command of Southern Army
Hisaichi Terauchi: Commander of Southern Army
Takazo Numata: Vice-Commander of Southern Army

Army Tactical Commands

Army High Level Inner Liaison with Army General Staff, IGHQ
Shuichi Miyazaki: Chief, First Bureau, Army General Staff Headquarters, attended operational liaison conference between IGHQ, Southern Army, and Fourteenth Area Army (Manila)

Minister of the Navy
Yonai Mitsumasa: Marine Minister
Koshiro Oikawa : Marine minister
Shigetarō Shimada: Marine Minister

Japanese Navy Strategic Thinking Group
Strike South Group - Strategists thinking group dominated by the Imperial Japanese Navy

Imperial Japanese Navy General Staff (Tokyo HQ)
Hiroyasu Fushimi : Chief of Navy General Staff
Osami Nagano: Chief of Navy General Staff
Shigetarō Shimada: Chief of Navy General Staff
Koshiro Oikawa: Chief of Navy General Staff
Soemu Toyoda: Chief of Navy General Staff
Shigeru Fukudome: Vice-Chief of Navy General Staff

Navy General Staff of Combined Fleet (Japan, later Truk HQ)
Isoroku Yamamoto: Chief of General Staff of Combined Fleet
Matome Ugaki: Vice-Chief of General Staff of Combined Fleet
Mineichi Koga: Chief of General Staff of Combined Fleet
Shigeru Fukudome: Vice-Chief of General Staff of Combined Fleet

Navy Tactical Commands

Navy-Army General Staff (IGHQ) Liaison Officer
Takushiro Hattori: Member (Army-Navy high level liaison), Naval General Staff; Naval Staff Officer (Operations) IGHQ; Section Chief (Operations), Army General Staff, IGHQ; Army Section Member, Naval General Staff Naval Staff Officer, IGHQ (Operations).
Joichiro Sanada: Chief, Second Section, (Army-Navy high level liaison) Army General Staff Headquarters; Staff Officer, IGHQ (Navy Section)

Inspectorate General of Military Training IGHQ
Rikichi Andō: Vice-Chief Inspectorate General of Military Training
Sadao Araki: Inspector General of Military Training
Shunroku Hata: Inspector General of Artillery Training
Harukichi Hyakutake: Inspector General of Signal Training
Hitoshi Imamura: Deputy Chief, Inspectorate General of Military Training
Masatane Kanda: Department Chief, Inspectorate General of Military Training
Masakazu Kawabe: Section Member, Inspectorate General of Military Training
Heitarō Kimura: Artillery Department, Office of Military Training
Kenzo Kitano: Section Member, Inspectorate General of Military Training
Shigenori Kuroda: Office of Military Training
Jinsaburo Mazaki: Section Chief, Office of Military Training; also Inspector General of Military Training
Hajime Sugiyama: Inspector General of Military Training
Akira Mutō: Member, Inspectorate General of Military Training
Tasuku Okada: Member, Inspectorate General of Military Training
Ichiro Shichida: Section Chief, Inspectorate General of Military Training
Tokumatsu Shigeta: Inspector General of Artillery Training
Sōsaku Suzuki: Chief, 2nd Section, Inspectorate General of Military Training
Shinichi Tanaka: Section Member, Inspectorate General of Military Training
Hisaichi Terauchi: Inspector General of Military Training
Otozō Yamada: Office of Cavalry Training (Inspectorate General of Military Training)
Prince Un Yi: Attached to Inspectorate-General of Military Training
Nobuyushi Muto: Inspector-General of Military Training
Yoshikazu Nishi: Inspector-General of Military Training

Inspectorate General of Aviation IGHQ
Tomoyuki Yamashita: Inspector general of Army Aviation
Prince Mikasa: Inspector general of Army Aviation
Torashirō Kawabe: Deputy Chief, Inspectorate General of Air Force
Korechika Anami: Inspector General of Army Aviation
Hideki Tōjō: Inspector General of Army Aviation
Kenji Doihara: Inspector General of Army Aviation

Imperial Supreme War Council (Senso-shi-do)

Chief Secretary of Supreme War Council
Akira Mutō: Chief Secretary of Supreme War Council
Mineo Ōsumi: Chief Secretary of Supreme War Council

Supreme War Councilor
Nobutake Kondō: Appointed to the Supreme War Council
Mitsumasa Yonai: Supreme War Councilor
Soemu Toyoda: Supreme War Councilor
Shigetarō Shimada: Appointed to Supreme War Council
Prince Fushimi Hiroyasu: Supreme War Councilor
Prince Un Yi: Member of the Supreme War Council
Waichirō Sonobe: Member of the Supreme War Council
Sadao Araki: Member Supreme War Council
Saburo Ando: Member Supreme War Council
Prince Asaka Yasuhiko: Member Supreme War Council
Prince Higashikuni Naruhiko: Member Supreme War Council
Shigeru Honjō: Member Supreme War Council
Shunroku Hata: Member Supreme War Council
Kenji Dohihara: Member Supreme War Council
Hisaichi Terauchi: Member of the Supreme War Council
Prince Nashimoto Morimasa: Member of the Supreme War Council
Prince Kaya Tsunenori: Member of the Supreme War Council
Prince Kan'in Kotohito: Member of the Supreme War Council
Hajime Sugiyama: Member of the Supreme War Council
Yoshijirō Umezu: Member of the Supreme War Council
Jinzaburō Masaki: Member of the Supreme War Council
Hideki Tōjō: Member of the Supreme War Council
Yoshikazu Nishi: Member of the Supreme War Council
Tomoyuki Yamashita: Member of the Supreme War Council
Shigeatsu Yamaoka: Member of the Supreme War Council
Takeo Yasuda: Member of the Supreme War Council

Military Councilors
Sadao Araki: Military Councilor
Hisaichi Terauchi: Military Councilor
Kantarō Suzuki: Military Councilor
Hajime Sugiyama: concurrently Military Councilor
Korechika Anami: concurrently Military Councilor
Kenji Doihara: Military Councilor
Shunroku Hata: Military Councilor
Naruhiko Higashikuni: Military Councilor
Jinsaburo Mazaki: Military Councilor
Yasuji Okamura: Military Councilor
Takeo Yasuda: Military Councilor
Prince Kan'in Kotohito: Military Councilor
Osami Nagano: Military Councilor
Shizuichi Teramoto: Military Councillor

"Imperial Throne Council of War"

President of the Imperial Throne Council of War
Yoshimichi Hara: President of the Imperial Throne Council of War

Imperial War Councilor
Mitsumasa Yonai: Imperial War Councilor
Shigetarō Shimada: Appointed to Imperial War Council

Home Defence

Home Defense Headquarters
Otozō Yamada: Commander-in-Chief, Home Defense Headquarters
Prince Higashikuni Naruhiko: Commander-in-Chief, Home Defense Headquarters

 Organization 
Fifth Area Army and Northern Army District (Sapporo)
Eleventh Area Army and Northeastern Army District (Sendai)
Twelfth Area Army and Eastern Army District (Tokyo)
Thirteenth Area Army and Tokai Army District (Nagoya)
Fifteenth Area Army and Central Army District (Osaka)
Shikoku Army District (Zentsuji)
Sixteenth Area Army and Western Army District (Fukuoka)
Seventeenth Area Army and Korea Army District (Seoul)
Tenth Area Army and Formosa Army District (Taipei)
Imperial General Headquarters in Matsushiro Fortress, Nagano Prefecture

Tokyo metropolitan area
Toshizō Nishio: Governor of the Tokyo metropolitan area; also was commander of civil law enforcement divisions in the metropolitan area, including Keishicho, Tokkō, Kempeitai and Tokeitai metropolitan units. The Imperial Guards remained under their own commander, who reported directly to the Emperor.

Tokyo Divisional District
Jo Iimura: Commanding General, Tokyo Defense Army; concurrently Commanding General, Tokyo Divisional District

Tokyo Defense Command
Yoshikazu Nishi: Commander Officer of Tokyo Defence Command

Tokyo Garrison Headquarters
Kiichiro Higuchi: Staff Officer, Tokyo Garrison Headquarters
Joichiro Sanada: Staff Officer, Tokyo Garrison Command

Tokyo Bay Fortress Detachment Officers
Shihei Oba: Commanding General, Tokyo Bay Fortress, concurrently Commanding General, Tokyo Bay Detachment
Tokumatsu Shigeta: Staff Officer, Tokyo Bay Fortress Detachment

Maizuru Fortified Zone
Kanji Ishiwara: Commanding General, Maizuru Fortified Zone

Tsushima Fortress Detachment
Kiyotake Kawaguchi: recalled to active duty, Commanding General, Tsushima Fortress
List of Army Fortresses in Japan proper

Officer assigned to General Defense Command
Shōjirō Iida: assigned to General Defense Command

Shinbu Group (Fourteenth Area Army command)
Shizuo Yokoyama: Commanding General, Shinbu Group (Fourteenth Area Army command)

Northeastern Army District Headquarters (Japan Proper)
Sinichi Tanaka: attached to Northeastern Army District Headquarters (Japan Proper)

Northern District Army Command
Kiichiro Higuchi: concurrently Commanding General, Northern District Army Command

Western Army District HQ
Kanji Nishihara: attached to Western Army District Headquarters

Western District Army Command
Shizuo Sakaguchi: attached to Western District Army Command

Central District Army Headquarters
Joichiro Sanada: Central District Army Headquarters

Central District Army Command
Masakazu Kawabe: concurrently Commanding General, Central District Army Command

Chosen Army District
Seishirō Itagaki: concurrently Commanding General, Chosen District Army Command

War Ministries

Munitions Minister
Hideki Tōjō: Concurrent chief of the Munitions Ministry, as Army figure in same Ministry
Nobusuke Kishi: As sometimes replaced at Gen Tojo in lead of Munitions Minister
Ginjirō Fujiwara: in charge of the Munitions Ministry
Shigeru Yoshida: Munitions Minister
Teijirō Toyoda: Marine and Munitions Ministry, as Navy figure in such Ministry
Takijiro Ohnishi: Chief of naval aviation development, a division of the Munitions Ministry; also father of the "Kamikaze" special forces
Chikuhei Nakajima: Munitions Minister and aircraft industrialist as linked with Army

Material Section, War Ministry
Hiroo Sato: Chief, Material Section, War Ministry

Sagami Army Arsenal
Tasuku Okada: Chief, Sagami Army Arsenal

Tokyo Army Arsenal
Kijirō Nambu: Chief, Tokyo Army Arsenal; he also founded and led Nambu Arms Manufacturing Company during wartime

Army Remount Department
Minoru Sasaki: Member, Army Remount Department

Inspector General of Chemical Warfare
Kanji Nishihara: Inspector General of Chemical Warfare
Kazumoto Machijiri: Inspector General of Chemical Warfare

Officer in Inspectorate General
Shinichi Tanaka: Chief of Staff, Inspectorate General, LOC

Army Section, Imperial General Headquarters
Prince Mikasa: Staff officer in the Army Section of the Imperial General Headquarters

Ōita PW Internment Camp Staff
Akira Mutō: member of Ōita PW Internment Camp staff

Army Allied Prisoner of War Information Bureau
Hitoshi Hamada: Deputy Chief Supervisor of Allied Prisoner of War Information Bureau

Army Commanders of Military Prisons and POW Camps in occupied territories
Lieutenant-General Igatu: General Officer Commanding Prisoner of War Camps Philippines
Shinpei Fukei: Commandant Prisoner of War Camps, Singapore
Major-General Arimina: Commandant Changi Jail, Singapore

War Minister

Prince Higashikuni Naruhiko: Minister of War
Senjuro Hayashi: Minister of War
Hajime Sugiyama: Minister of War
Sadao Araki: Minister of War
Jirō Minami: Minister of War
Shunroku Hata: Minister of War
Kazushige Ugaki: Minister of War
Yoshijirō Umezu: Minister of War
Seishirō Itagaki: Minister of War
Hideki Tōjō: Minister of War
Korechika Anami: Minister of War
Hisaichi Terauchi: Minister of War
Shigenori Kuroda: Minister of War
Nobuyuki Abe: Minister of War

Deputy Minister of War
Nobuyuki Abe: Deputy Minister of War

Vice-Minister of War
Yoshinori Shirakawa: Vice-Minister of War
Mikio Furusho: Vice-Minister of War
Toranosuke Hashimoto: Vice-Minister of War
Korechika Anami: Vice-Minister of War
Kazushige Ugaki: War Vice-Minister
Hajime Sugiyama: Vice-Minister of War
Hideki Tōjō: Vice-Minister of War
Heisuke Yanagawa: War Vice-Minister
Hyotaro Yamada: War Vice-Minister
Heitarō Kimura: War Vice-Minister
Koiso Kuniaki: War Vice-Minister
Masataka Yamawaki: War Vice-Minister

Secretary to the War Minister
Joichiro Sanada: Secretary to War Minister; concurrently Adjutant in the same Ministry; Aide to the War Minister; Staff Officer, Tokyo Garrison Command
Takushiro Hattori: Secretary to the War Minister; Adjutant, War Ministry
Joichiro Sanada: Aide to War Minister, IGHQ
Hiroo Sato: Adjutant to the War Minister
Yoshio Kozuki: Secretary to the War Minister; Adjutant, War Ministry
Toshizō Nishio: Adjutant, War Ministry; Secretary to the War Minister; Governor, Tokyo Metropolitan area
Yozo Miyama: Senior Adjutant, War Ministry
Okitsugu Arao: Secretary to the War Minister

Military Affairs Bureau, War Ministry
Kenryo Sato: Chief, Army Affairs Bureau
Kitsuju Ayabe: Member, Army Affairs Section
Tetsuzan Nagata: Chief, Military Affairs Bureau
Hitoshi Imamura: Chief, Military Affairs Bureau, War Ministry
Kiyotake Kawaguchi: Member, Military Affairs Bureau, War Ministry
Heitarō Kimura: Chief, Military Administration Bureau, War Ministry
Masahiko Takeshita: Chief of the Domestic affairs section of the Military Affairs Bureau
Machijiri Kazumoto: Chief of Army Affairs Section, Military Affairs Bureau, Ministry of War and Head of Military Affairs Bureau, in same Ministry
Takeji Nara: Head of Military Affairs Bureau, Ministry of War
Kenji Hatanaka: Officer in Military Affairs Section
Yoshio Kozuki: assigned to the Military Affairs Bureau
Tadamichi Kuribayashi: Member, Military Affairs Bureau
Renya Mutaguchi: Military Affairs Bureau, War Ministry
Tetsuzan Nagata: Chief, Military Affairs Bureau
Hidemitsu Nakano: Member, Military Affairs Bureau, War Ministry
Kanji Nishihara: Section Member, Military Affairs Bureau
Kengo Noda: Member, Military Affairs Bureau, War Ministry
Hideyoshi Obata: Member, Military Affairs Bureau, War Ministry
Sanji Okido: Member, Military Affairs Bureau, War Ministry
Joichiro Sanada: Chief, Military Affairs Bureau
Minoru Sasaki: Military Affairs Bureau, War Ministry
Hajime Sugiyama: Chief, Military Affairs Bureau
Sōsaku Suzuki: Member, Military Affairs Bureau
Teiichi Suzuki: Member, Military Affairs Bureau, War Ministry
Sizuichi Tanaka: Member, Military Affairs Bureau
Yuitsu Tsuchihashi: Member, Military Affairs Bureau, War Ministry
Tomoyuki Yamashita: Member and Chief, Army Affairs Section, Military Affairs Bureau, War Ministry
Takeo Yasuda: Chief, Defense Section, Military Affairs Bureau, War Ministry
Isamu Yokoyama: Military Affairs Bureau, War Ministry
Takeji Nara: Head of Military Affairs Bureau, Ministry of War
Isamu Chō: Attached to Military Affairs Bureau, Ministry of War

Economic Mobilization Bureau in War Ministry and related sections
Shigenori Kuroda: Section Chief (Conscription), War Ministry
Tetsuzan Nagata: Section Chief, Economic Mobilization Bureau
Koiso Kuniaki: Chief, Materiel Mobilization Bureau, War Ministry
Heitarō Kimura: Section Chief, Economic Mobilization Bureau, War Ministry
Kanji Nishihara: attached to Army Technical Department
Toshishiro Obata: Chief, Operations Bureau, Army General Staff
Joichiro Sanada: Member, War Ministry Maintenance section; Chief, Army Affairs Section, Military Affairs Bureau, War Ministry
Minoru Sasaki: Ordnance Bureau, War Ministry, Army Ordnance Main Depot, Mechanized Department
Sōsaku Suzuki: Army Ordnance, Administration Department
Kenryo Sato: Chief, Military Affairs Bureau, War Ministry
Teichii Suzuki: Military Affairs Bureau; concurrently Member of the Cabinet Research Board
Shinichi Tanaka: Chief, Military Service Section, War Ministry
Yoshijirō Umezu: Ordnance Bureau, War Ministry
Isamu Yokoyama: Economic Mobilization Bureau, War Ministry; Section Chief, Planning Bureau, Cabinet Resources Board

Personal Bureau of War Ministry
Yaezo Akashiba: Member, Personnel Bureau
Korechika Anami: Chief, Personnel Bureau
Yasuji Okamura: Chief, Assignments Section, Personnel Bureau, War Ministry
Tan Nukata: Chief, Personnel Bureau, War Ministry
Sanji Okido: attached to Personnel Bureau, War Ministry
Otozō Yamada: Chief, Personnel Bureau

Press Relations Branch, Ministry of War
Masaharu Homma: Chief of Press Relations Branch, Ministry of War

Army Field Marshal
Prince Kan'in Kotohito:- Field Marshal
Prince Nashimoto Morimasa:- Field Marshal
Shunroku Hata:- Field Marshal
Hisaichi Terauchi:- Field Marshal
Hajime Sugiyama:- Field Marshal
Prince Higashikuni Naruhiko:- Field Marshal
Nobuyoshi Mutō:- Field Marshal

Provost Marshal General
Sadao Araki: Provost Marshal General
Fusataro Teshima: Provost Marshal General (LtGen)
Shigeru Taiboku: Provost Marshal General
Toranosuke Hashimoto: Provost Marshal General, later the Japanese first priest in Shintoist central Shrine in Hsinking, led the Cultural Japanese entity in Manchukuo, amongst operative leader of Manchoukouan Intelligence services.

General Affairs Bureau, Provost Marshal Headquarters
Fusataro Teshima: Chief, General Affairs Bureau, Provost Marshal Headquarters

Inspectorate General of Military Training
Rikichi Andō: Vice-Chief Inspectorate General of Military Training
Sadao Araki: Inspector General of Military Training
Shunroku Hata: Inspector General of Artillery Training
Harukichi Hyakutake: Inspector General of Signal Training
Hitoshi Imamura: Deputy Chief, Inspectorate General of Military Training
Masatane Kanda: Department Chief, Inspectorate General of Military Training
Masakazu Kawabe: Section Member, Inspectorate General of Military Training
Heitarō Kimura: Artillery Department, Office of Military Training
Kenzo Kitano: Section Member, Inspectorate General of Military Training
Shigenori Kuroda: Office of Military Training
Jinsaburo Mazaki: Section Chief, Office of Military Training; also Inspector General of Military Training
Akira Mutō: Member, Inspectorate General of Military Training
Tasuku Okada: Member, Inspectorate General of Military Training
Ichiro Shichida: Section Chief, Inspectorate General of Military Training
Tokomatsu Shigeta: Inspector General of Artillery Training
Sōsaku Suzuki: Chief, 2nd Section, Inspectorate General of Military Training
Sinichi Tanaka: Section Member, Inspectorate General of Military Training
Hisaichi Terauchi: Inspector General of Military Training
Otozō Yamada: Office of Cavalry Training (Inspectorate General of Military Training)
Heisuke Yanagawa: Inspector-General of Cavalry Training

Imperial Army-Navy military teaching and training services units
See: Military instructors and trainers of the Empire of Japan

Army Officers in Reserve list
Sadao Araki: retired, March 1936, later enter in politic activities
Jirō Minami: placed on reserve list, 1936, later recalled
Nobuyuki Abe: In 1936 put on reserve list with rank of general
Rikichi Andō: transferred to reserve list, January 1941; recalled to active duty
Keisuke Fujie: retired, April 1945; recalled to active duty
Masaharu Homma: transferred to First Reserve List, August 1943
Shōjirō Iida: retired, December 1944; later recalled
Kanji Ishiwara: retired, 1938; recalled to active duty, 1938–40
Kiyotake Kawaguchi: unassigned list, March 1943; transferred to first reserve list, April 1943
Teiichi Suzuki: transferred to first reserve list
Renya Mutaguchi: retired, December 1944
Toshizō Nishio: placed on reserve list, 1942
Ichiro Shicida: retired, April 1945; recalled to active duty
Hideki Tōjō: relieved of all military and political posts, July 1944; retired to first reserve list
Kioji Tominaga: transferred to first reserve list (Formosa), May 1945
Koiso Kuniaki: retired to first reserve list, July 1938
Yoshitoshi Tokugawa: Was entered on Reserve list (1939), for later retirement to civilian life (1939). He was called to operational service during 1944–45.

Army

Deputy Chief of Army General Staff
Jun Ushiroku: Senior Deputy Chief of Army General Staff
Hikosaburo Hata: Second Deputy Chief of Army General Staff
Torashirō Kawabe: Deputy Chief of Army General Staff
Hajime Sugiyama: Deputy Chief of Army General Staff

Chief of Army General Staff
Prince Kan'in Kotohito: Chief of the Army General Staff
Hideki Tōjō: Chief of Army General Staff
Yoshijirō Umezu: Chief of Army General Staff
Hajime Sugiyama: Chief of Army General Staff

Bureau Chief of Army General Staff
Sadao Araki: Bureau Chief of Army General Staff

1st Bureau Chief of Army General Staff
Kitsuju Ayabe: Head 1st Bureau General Staff
Morikazu Amano: Chief 1st Section General Staff

2nd Bureau Chief of Army General Staff
Seizo Arisue: Head 2nd Bureau General Staff
Kiichiro Higuchi: Head 2nd Bureau General Staff

Vice Chief of Army General Staff
Kiyoshi Imai: Vice Chief of Army General Staff
Nobuyushi Muto: Vice Chief of Army General Staff

Army General Staff
Hideo Iwakuro
Muraji Yano
Saburo Hayashi
Hatazō Adachi
Rikichi Andō
Sadao Araki
Okitsugu Arao
Kitsuju Ayabe
Kenji Doihara
Keisuke Fujie
Shunroku Hata
Takushiro Hattori
Prince Higashikuni Naruhiko
Kiichiro Higuchi
Masaharu Homma
Prince Chichibu
Harukichi Hyakutake
Jo Iimura
Hitoshi Imamura
Kanji Ishiwara
Masatane Kanda
Tadasu Kataoka
Masakazu Kawabe
Torashirō Kawabe
Kiyotake Kawabe
Heitarō Kimura
Seiichi Kita
Kenzo Kitano
Kuniaki Koiso
Yoshio Kozuki
Shuichi Miyazaki
Takeshi Mori
Renya Mutaguchi
Akira Mutō
Tetsuzan Nagata
Hidemitsu Nakano
Mitsuo Nakazawa
Masahiko Takeshita
Kengo Noda
Shihei Oba
Hideyoshi Obata
Tasuku Okada
Sanji Okido
Minoru Sasaki
Ichiro Shichida
Hajime Sugiyama
Sōsaku Suzuki
Teiichi Suzuki
Shinichi Tanaka
Shizuichi Tanaka
Kumaichi Teramoto
Kyoji Tominaga
Yuitsu Tsuchihashi deputy Chief-of-Staff of China Expeditionary Army in October 1940.
Toshimichi Uemura
Otozō Yamada
Tomoyuki Yamashita
Isamu Yokoyama
Shizuo Yokoyama

20th Group - War Coordination, Army General Staff
Makoto Matsutani: Chief, 20th Group-War Coordination, Army General Staff

Operations Section, Army General Staff
Seijun Inada: Chief of Operations Section, Army General Staff

Third Section-Organization and Mobilization, Army General Staff
Yozo Miyama: Chief, Third Section (Organization and Mobilization), Army General Staff
Kitsuju Ayabe: Section Chief, Third Section (Organization and Mobilization), Army General Staff

Chief of General Intelligence Bureau in Army General Staff
Seizo Arisue: Chief of General Intelligence Bureau in Army General Staff

Second Bureau (Intelligence Division), Army General Staff
Major General Okamoto: Chief, Second Bureau (Intelligence Division), Army General Staff, at the time of the outbreak of the Pacific War. His staff consisted of Colonel Kotani, Navy officer Captain Onoda, and Mr.Yosano, Foreign Office Chancellor.
Seizo Arisue: Chief, Second Bureau (Intelligence Division), Army General Staff
Harukichi Hyakutake: Chief of the Cryptographic Section (Intelligence Division), Army General Staff

Russian unit of Second Bureau (Intelligence Division) Army General Staff
Saburo Hayashi: Commander of Russian unit, Second Bureau (Intelligence) Army General Staff

Japanese Army Intelligence Services units
Hideki Tōjō, the highest operative Chief in Japanese Army Intelligence Services in wartime
Prince Takeda Tsuneyoshi as the underground, supreme chief and secret agent in Japanese Secret Service in Manchukuo
Toranosuke Hashimoto as Operative Commander of Manchoukouan Secret services under the lead of Prince Takeda amongst Kempeitai services
Torashirō Kawabe Staff Officer (Operations/Intelligence), Kwantung Army
Kingoro Hashimoto Chief, Special Service Agency, Hailar, Kwantung Army
Harukichi Hyakutake Chief of the Special Service Agency, Kwantung Army in Harbin
Kuniaki Koiso leader of Special Services Agency in Manchukuo
Michitarō Komatsubara intelligence chief of Special Services Agency in Harbin for some time
Noboyushi Obata (Shinryo) chief of Special Services Agency in Harbin
Kanji Tsuneoka Directed the Mongol department of Kwantung Army in land and native saboteurs and secret agent units
Hiroshi Akita Chief of German Section of Japanese Military Intelligence in this period
Masayoshi Yamamoto Led the Matsu Kikan (Pine Tree) Secret Agency, under command of 19th Army, with HQ in Ambon (Dutch Indies)
Jinzo Nomoto intelligence officer sent by a unit of the Imperial Japanese Army to Tibet and Sinkiang

Army Technical Research Institute
Lieutenant-General Gondo:Director 9th Dept Army Technical Research Institute
Yoshikazu Nishi: Head of General Affairs Bureau in Technical Research Institute

Third Bureau (Logistics), Army General Staff
Tan Nukata: Chief, Third Bureau-Logistics, Army General Staff
Goro Isoya: Chief, Third Bureau-Logistics, Army General Staff

Railways and Shipping section, Army General Staff
Okitsugu Arao: Section Chief (Railways and Shipping), Army General Staff

Army Ordnance and Army Shipping Department
Yoshio Kozuki: Commanding General, Shipping Transportation Headquarters
Sōsaku Suzuki: Army Ordnance, Administration Department; Chief, Army Shipping Department Shipping Transportation Headquarters
Hideo Baba: General Officer Commanding Army Maritime Transport Command
Hakaru Gondo: Commanding Officer 13th Shipping Group

Chairman of the Military Affairs Bureau
Tetsuzan Nagata: Military Affairs Bureau and Economic Mobilization Bureau
Kenryo Sato: Chief of the Military Affairs Bureau, Government Planning Board
Rikichi Andō: Chief, Military Administration Section, Military Administration Bureau
Renya Mutaguchi: Military Affairs Bureau
Akiho Ishii: Chief, Military Affairs Section, War Ministry
Okitsugu Arao: Chief, Army Affairs Section, Military Affairs Bureau
Susumu Nishiura: Chief, Army Affairs Section, War Ministry
Tan Nukata: Chief, General Affairs Bureau
Hitoshi Imamura: Section Chief, Military Affairs Bureau
Yoshio Kozuki: Military Affairs Bureau and Military Administration Bureau; member Military Administration Bureau
Kanji Nishihara: Section Member, Military Affairs Bureau; Inspector General of Chemical Warfare
Takeo Yasuda: Chief, Defense Section, Military Affairs Bureau, War Ministry

Commanders Officer Army Home Stations
Masao Iwasa: Commanding Officer Tokyo Home Station
Jinzaburo Ishitani: Commanding Officer Tsu Home Station, Commanding Officer Ujiyamada Home Station, Commanding Officer Yokkaichi Home Station
Juzo Hirata: Commanding Officer Shibata Home Station
Seiji Ikehama: Commanding Officer Ashigawa Home Station and Commanding Officer Obihiro Home Station
Keinosuke Iizuka: Commanding Officer Akita Home Station
Tomejiro Hishiki: Commanding Officer Wakamatsu Home Station
Jūrō Gotō: Commanding Officer Kofu Home Station
Hisao Harada: Commanding Officer Matsumo Home Station, Commanding Officer Muramatsu Home Station and Commanding Officer Takeda Home Station

Army Aeronautical Department
Administrative Chief of Administrative Division, Army Aeronautical Department
Korechika Anami: Chief, Army Aeronautical Department
Shunroku Hata: Chief, Administrative Division, Army Aeronautical Department
Prince Higashikuni Naruhiko: Chief, Administrative Division, Army Aeronautical Department
Takuma Shimoyama: Chief Administrative Division, Army Aeronautical Department
Michio Sugawara: Chief Administrative Division, Army Aeronautical Department
Hajime Sugiyama: Chief, Administrative Division, Army Aeronautical Department
Kumaichi Teramoto: Member, Administrative Division, Army Aeronautical Department
Takeo Yasuda: Chief, Administrative Division, Army Aeronautical Department
Koiso Kuniaki: Chief, Administrative Division, Army Aeronautical Department
Tsuneori Kaya: Attached to Administration, Army Aeronautical Department, Ministry of War

Chief of the Army Aviation Headquarters
Tomoyuki Yamashita: Chief of the Army Aviation Headquarters

Inspectorate General of Army Air Force
Tomoyuki Yamashita: Inspector General of Army Aviation
Prince Mikasa: Inspector General of Army Aviation
Korechika Anami: Inspector General of Army Aviation
Torashirō Kawabe: Deputy Chief, Inspectorate General of Air Force
Hideki Tōjō: Inspector General of Army Aviation
Kenji Doihara: Inspector General of Army Aviation

Air Armies General Commanders
Masakazu Kawabe: Commanding General, Air General Army, (took charge of Army air operations in homeland, Chosen and Ryukyus)
Takeo Yasuda: Commanding General, First Air Army
Torashirō Kawabe: Commanding General, Second Air Army (Manchuria)
Hideyoshi Obata: Third Air Army General Commander
Michio Sugawara: Third Air Army Commander and Sixth Air Army Commander. Between March and May 1945, General Sugawara was engaged in the Ten-Go Air Operation, under the Commander-in-Chief, Combined Fleet
Kumaichi Teramoto: Commanding General, Fourth Air Army
Kyoji Tominaga: Fourth Air Army Commander
Takuma Shimoyama: At end of World War II, he was Commanding General (LtGen), Fifth Air Army, stationed in Seoul, Chosen
Prince Un Yi: General Officer Commanding First Air Army

Air Groups Commanders
Michio Sugawara: First Air Group Commander
Kumaichi Teramoto: Commanding General, Second Air Group (LtGen)
Hideyoshi Obata: Fifth Air Group Commander and Third Air Group Commander

Air Regiment Commanders
Michio Sugawara: LtCol (Air Force), Regimental Commander, 6th Air Regiment (Colonel)
Rikishi Tsukada: LtCol/Colonel (Air Force) Officer attached to 7th Air Regiment; later 7th Air Regiment Commander
Kumaichi Teramoto: Regimental Commander, 8th Air Regiment (Colonel, Air Force)
Takuma Shimoyama: Regimental Commander, 16th Air Regiment
Hideyoshi Obata: Regimental Commander, 16th Air Regiment
Yoshitoshi Tokugawa: Commanding Officer 1st Air Regiment

Air Force Brigade Commanders
Michio Sugawara: Brigade Commander, 2nd Air Brigade, Brigade Commander, 3rd Air Brigade

Air Force Staff Officers
Prince Mikasa: Member of Staff of the Air General Army
Rikishi Tsukada: Chief of Staff, First Air Group
Takuma Shimoyama: Staff Officer, Air Force
Michio Sugawara: Department (MajGen), Staff Officer, Air Force administration

Officer Attached to Second Air Group HQ
Hideyoshi Obata: Colonel (Air Force) --attached to Second Air Group Headquarters

Commanding Officer in Air Battalion
Yoshitoshi Tokugawa: Commanding Officer 2nd Air Battalion

Acting General Officer Commanding Army Aviation Corps
Yoshitoshi Tokugawa: Acting General Officer Commanding Army Aviation Corps and General Officer Commanding Army Aviation Corps

Air Force Commanders, Directors and instructors in Air Schools 
Hideyoshi Obata: Commandant, Akeno Army Air School, Commanding General, same school (MajGen)
Michio Sugawara: Commandant, Shimoshizu Army Air School and Commandant, Military Air Academy and Air Training Army Commander
Kumaichi Teramoto: Director/Superintendent, Hamamatsu Army Air School (MajGen)
Rikishi Tsukada: Instructor, Hamamatsu Army Air School
Yoshitoshi Tokugawa: Commandant of Akeno Army Aviation School and Commandant of Tokorozawa Army Aviation School, Director of Training Department, Tokorozawa Army Aviation School, Commandant of Central Army Aviation School

Chief of Army Aeronautical Department (operative unit)
Takuma Shimoyama: Chief, Army Aeronautical Department (MajGen)
Himeji Sugiyama: Chief, Army Aeronautical Department
Michio Sugawara: Chief, Army Aeronautical Department
Kumaichi Teramoto: Chief, Army Aeronautical Department

Deputy Chief of Army Aeronautical Department
Michio Sugawara: Deputy Chief of Army Aeronautical Department

Chief of Second Bureau, Army Aeronautical Department
Takeo Yasuda: Chief, Second Bureau, Army Aeronautical Department

Chief of Army Air Technical Laboratories
Takeo Yasuda: Chief, Army Air Technical Laboratories

Technicals and Experts in Army Aeronautical Sciences
Michio Sugawara: Major (Air Force); Section Chief, Army Aeronautical Department
Kumaichi Teramoto: LtCol (Air Force), Officer attached; later member of Army Aeronautical Department
Takeo Yasuda: Officer attached to Army Air Technical Laboratories (MajGen)
Yoshitoshi Tokugawa: Director of the Research Department, Tokorozawa Army Aviation School

Imperial Japanese Army Air Force units

64th Sentai units (Bangkok Airfield, 1941)
Major/Lieutenant Colonel Tateo Katō: Group leader
Captain Katsumi Anma: Group Leader
Sergeant Shigeaku Wakayama
Lieutenant Hiroshi Okuyama
Lieutenant Tadashi Kataoka
Captain Haruyasu Maruo
Captain Yasuiko Kuroe
Lieutenant Yohei Hinoki
Lieutenant Takeshi Endo
Sergeant Aikichi Misago
Sergeant Yoshiko Yasuda
Sergeant Chikara Goto
Corporal Hirano

Kurai Chutai, 502nd Sentai unit (Nakatsu Airfield, 1945)
Staff Sergeant Joten Naito

Hane Chutai, 2nd Air Army unit (Hsinking East Airfield, 1945)
Captain Kamata

Kwantung Army Commanders (until 1945)
Taka Hishikari: Commander in Chief Kwantung Army
Nobuyushi Muto: Commander in Chief Kwantung Army
Kenkichi Ueda: Commander of Kwantung Army
Shigeru Honjō: Commander of Kwantung Army
Yoshitake Muraoka: Commander of Kwantung Army
Senjuro Hayashi: Commander of Kwantung Army, Prime Minister
Yoshijirō Umezu: Commander of Kwantung Army, War Vice Minister
Jirō Minami: Commander of Kwantung Army; concurrently Official Ambassador to Manchukuo
Tomoyuki Yamashita: Commander of Kwantung Army
Otozō Yamada: Commander of Kwantung Army
Takuma Shimoyama: Kwantung Army Headquarters; Adviser, Manchukuoan Military Administration Bureau
Shizuo Yokoyama: Commander of Railway Sector Headquarters, Kwantung Army
Atazo Adachi: Commander, Kwantung Army Railroad Command

Kwantung Government-General Administration
Sadao Araki: Officer (Major), Kwantung Government-General
Koiso Kuniaki: Army Staff Officer, Kwantung Government-General
Jun Ushiroku: Officer, assigned to Kwantung Government-General
Saburo Ando: Commandant of Port Arthur
H.Ukita: Commander of Ryojun Naval Guard District and Station
 
For a complete structure see:
Organization of the Kwantung Army of Japan

Structures in other Japanese armies
See:
Structure of the Taiwan Army of Japan
Organization of the Imperial Japanese Army, Hokkai (North) region
Organization of the China Garrison detachment of the Imperial Japanese Army (to 1937)
Structure of the Japanese Army in Mengjiang
Organization of Japanese Expeditionary forces in China
Organization of Japanese forces in Southeast Asia
Organization of the Imperial Japanese Navy Alaskan Strike Group
Structure of the Imperial Japanese forces in the South Seas Mandate
Organization of Japanese defensive units in Okinawa

Police

Commander in Chief of Kempeitai units
Kesago Nakajima: Since 1921–41 lead the Kempeitai operation inside Japan and Asia during wartimes
Kenzo Kitano: Military Police (Gendarmerie) Commander, China Forces
Hideki Tōjō: Commanding General, Military Police, Kwantung Army
Sanji Okido: Commander, Military Police
Takeshi Mori: Deputy Chief, Military Police Headquarters
Shizuichi Tanaka: Chief, General Affairs Bureau; Military Police Forces Headquarters; Commander, Kwantung Army Military Police Units; Commander, Military Police Forces (LtGen)
Keisuke Fujie: Chief, General Affairs Bureau, Military Police; Headquarters, Kwantung Army; Commander, Kwantung Army Military Police
Moto Inkai: General Officer Commanding Kempeitai unit, Chosen
Rokuro Iwasa: Commander in Chief Kempeitai Forces, Tokyo Hq
Tuyoji Hirano: Commanding Officer Kempeitai Section 25th Army, Sumatra

Tokeitai police service units
Isoge Taro:- Operative leader of Joho Kyoko (Japanese naval intelligence) and Tokeitai (naval military police)

Imperial Guards unit

Sadao Araki: Company Commander, 1st Infantry Regiment, Imperial Guard Division, during Russo-Japanese War
Jinsaburo Mazaki: Regimental Commander, 1st Infantry, Imperial Guard Division
Makino Shiro: Battalion Commander, 4th Imperial Guard Infantry Regiment
Shōjirō Iida: Regimental Commander, 4th Infantry, Imperial Guard Division, General Officer Commanding 2nd Imperial Guards Division
Hisaichi Terauchi: Regimental Commander, 3rd Imperial Guards (Colonel); Chief of Staff, Imperial Guard Regiment; Chief of Staff, Imperial Guard Division
Korechika Anami: Regimental Commander, 2nd Imperial Guards unit
Fusataro Teshima: Imperial Guard Division Commander
Kioji Tominaga: Infantry Regiment Commander, 2nd Imperial Guards
Akira Mutō: Imperial Guard Division Commander; 2nd Imperial Guard Division Commander
Nobuyoshi Obata: Commanding Officer, Transportation Regiment, Imperial Guard Division
Tadasu Kataoka: Commander, Imperial Guard Cavalry Regiment; Commander, Imperial Guard Reconnaissance Regiment
Tadamichi Kuribayashi: Commanding General, 2nd Imperial Guard Depot Division (LtGen)
Takeshi Mori: Commanding General, 1st Imperial Guard Division, killed during abortive coup d'état launched against him at Imperial Palace
Major-General Imaye Chief of Staff 2nd Imperial Guards Division, Malaya
Hideo Iwakuro: Commanding Officer 5th Imperial Guards Regiment, Malaya
Chikara Hiraoka: Chief Military Affairs Department 1st Imperial Guards Division
Yaezo Akashiba: General Officer Commanding 1st Imperial Guards Division, Tokyo
Prince Asaka Yasuhiko: General Officer Commanding 1st Imperial Guards Division
Susumu Harada: Commanding Officer 3rd Imperial Guards Brigade
Teiko Itada: General Officer Commanding Imperial Guards Division, China
Prince Un Yi: Commanding Officer 2nd Imperial Guards Brigade
Machijiri Kazumoto: Commanding Officer Imperial Guards Artillery Regiment
Tsuneori Kaya: General Officer Commanding 2nd Imperial Guards Depot Division
Prince Kan'in Kotohito: General Officer Commanding Imperial Guards Division
Kazuo Mizutani: Chief of Staff, First Imperial Guards Division in Eastern District Army

Commander of Keishicho Civil Police forces
Juzo Nishio: Governor of the Tokyo metropolitan area
Kōichi Kido: Home Affairs Minister
Hideki Tōjō: Home Affairs Minister
Hiranuma Kiichirō: Home Affairs Minister
Saburo Ando : Home Affairs Minister
Tsuneo Matsudaira : Home Affairs Minister
Akira Kazami: Justice Ministry
Heisuke Yanagawa: Justice Ministry
Hiranuma Kiichirō: Justice Minister

Operative Chief of Keishicho Civil Police units
Tsukio Tomioka: Operative Keishicho Police Chief in Tokio metropolitan area
Sergeant Kiyokawa: Keishicho Officer Police

Tokko police service unit
Kesago Nakajima: Since 1921–41 lead the State Police (Tokko) operations inside Japan and Asia during wartimes
Officer Maruyama: underground unit, in Censorship department in Tokko Intelligence service, in Tokyo, Japan

Marine Ministries

War Relief Association
Mitsumasa Yonai: adviser to War Relief Association

Marine Ministers
Shigetarō Shimada: Ministry of the Navy of Japan; Commandant in Kure and Yokosuka Naval Districts; Commander, China Navy Area Fleet; Chief of Naval General Staff
Teijirō Toyoda: Marine Minister
Takasumi Oka: Marine minister
Mineo Ōsumi: Marine Minister
Koshiró Oikawa: Marine Minister
Naokuni Nomura: Marine Minister
Mitsumasa Yonai: Marine Minister; Commander-in-Chief, First Expeditionary Fleet (Yangtze River); Commander Yokosuka and Sasebo Naval District; Commander-in-Chief, Combined Fleet; Imperial and Supreme War Councilor; Ex-Prime Minister and political adviser

Vice-Marine Ministers
Kantarō Suzuki: Vice-Minister of Navy
Shigeyoshi Inoue: Vice-Minister of Navy

Private Secretary to the Minister of the Navy
Sokichi Takagi: Private Secretary to the Minister of the Navy

Navy Admirals of the Fleet
Prince Fushimi Hiroyasu
Isoroku Yamamoto
Osami Nagano
Mineichi Koga

Navy Admirals
Isoroku Yamamoto
Koshiro Oikawa
Soemu Toyoda
Teijirō Toyoda
Mitsumasa Yonai
Saito Makoto
Kantarō Suzuki
Chuichi Nagumo
Shigetarō Shimada
Hiroaki Abe

Navy Staff College's Research Department
Sokichi Takagi: Member in Navy Staff College's Research Department

Third Department in Marine Ministry
Shigetarō Shimada: Chief of Third Department in Marine Ministry

Bureau of Naval Affairs
Nobuzo Tohmatsu: Chief of Naval Affairs

Bureau of Naval Supply
Nobuzo Tohmatsu: Chief of Bureau of Naval Supply

Bureau of Naval Accounting
Nobuzo Tohmatsu: Chief of Bureau of Naval Accounting

Naval Aviation Bureau
Eikitchi Katagiri: Chief of Naval Aviation Bureau
Kazume Kinsei: Officer of Naval Aviation Bureau. Created some plans for bombing strikes against territory of the United States

Imperial Japanese Navy Air Force units

Fighter Unit (Carrier Akagi, 1941)
Lieutenant Commander Shigeru Itaya

Tainan Air Corps (Denpasar Airfield, 1942)
1st Class Petty Officer Saburō Sakai

Yokosuka Air Corps (Yokosuka Airfield, 1943)
Warrant Officer/Instructor Hiroyoshi Nishizawa

253rd Air Corps (Rabaul Airfield, 1944)
Warrant Officer Tetsuzō Iwamoto

303 Squadron, 203rd Air Corps (Kagoshima Airfield, 1945)
Captain-Petty Officer Tanimizu

Navy General Staff's Intelligence Division
Mineichi Koga: Chief of the Navy General Staff's Intelligence Division

Japanese Navy Secret Service units
Isoge Taro:- Operative leader of Joho Kyoko (Japanese naval intelligence) and Tokeitai (naval military police)
Captain Onoda: Navy figure, in the Second Bureau (Intelligence Division), Japanese Army
Kanyei Chuyo: Commander in Japanese Navy Secret services. Directed the 8th Section "Yashika". Between this unit stay the "Tokyo Gimusho" office (the "Australian Section") linked with Japanese Naval Intelligence Staff under command of Imperial Navy General Staff. The office had orders to researching any affairs of the British Empire in Southeast Asia and Pacific Area.

Japanese Imperial Navy's Advisory Bureau on Jewish Affairs
Inuzuka Koreshige: member of Japanese Imperial Navy's Advisory Bureau on Jewish Affairs

Operation Section of Naval General Staff
Shigeru Fukudome: Chief, of Operation Section of Naval General Staff

Plans Division Office of Operation Section in Naval General Staff
Sadatoshi Tomioka: Chief in Plans Division Office of Operation Section in Naval General Staff;he was proposer and support plans for Australian Invasion.

Naval Research Section
Sokichi Takagi: Chief of Naval Research Section

Technical Council in Navy Technical Department
Mitsumasa Yonai: Member, Technical Council, Navy Technical Department, Yokosuka Naval Station

Naval Aviation Development Division in Munitions Ministry
Takijiro Ohnishi: Chief of the Naval Aviation Development Division in the Munitions Ministry; was the Japanese Navy figure in same ministry

President of Japanese Naval Staff College
Nobutake Kondō: President of the Japanese Naval Staff College

Navy Officers in Reserve list
Mitsumasa Yonai: Navy officer placed on reserve list
Shigetarō Shimada: retired to Reserve, January 1945 (at own request);

Navy

Chief of Naval General Staff
Nobutake Kondō: Chief of Naval General Staff
Prince Fushimi Hiroyasu: Chief of Naval General Staff
Abo Kiyokazu: Chief of Naval General Staff
Shigetarō Shimada: Chief of Naval General Staff
Osami Nagano: Chief of Naval General Staff
Jisaburō Ozawa: Chief of Naval General Staff
Kantarō Suzuki: Chief of Naval General Staff
Mineichi Koga: Chief of Naval General Staff

Staff Officer of Naval General Staff
Shigetarō Shimada: Staff Officer of Naval General Staff
Prince Kuni Asaakira: Staff Officer of Naval General Staff

Vice-Chief of Naval General Staff
Shigetarō Shimada: Vice-Chief, Naval General Staff
Seiichi Itō: Vice-Chief of Naval Staff
Shigeru Fukudome: Vice-Chief of Naval Staff
Mineichi Koga: Vice-Chief of the Naval General Staff

Naval General Staff
Tamon Yamaguchi: Member, Naval General Staff
Shigetarō Shimada: Member, Naval General Staff
Kantarō Suzuki: Member, Naval General Staff
Mitsumasa Yonai: Member, Naval General Staff
Prince Nobuhito: Officer attached to Naval General Staff

Commander-in-Chief of Combined Fleet
Kantarō Suzuki: Commander-in-Chief of Combined Fleet,
Mitsumasa Yonai: Commander-in-Chief, Combined Fleet and, concurrently, First Fleet
Shigetarō Shimada: Chief of Staff 1st Fleet—Chief of Staff, Combined Fleet
Isoroku Yamamoto: Commander-in-Chief of the Combined Fleet
Mineichi Koga: Commander-in-Chief of the Combined Fleet
Soemu Toyoda: Commander-in-Chief of the Combined Fleet
Jisaburō Ozawa: Commander-in-Chief of the Combined Fleet

Vice-Commander of Combined Fleet
Matome Ugaki: Vice-Commander of the Combined Fleet

Chief of Staff of Combined Fleet
Shigetarō Shimada: Chief of Staff of the Combined Fleet
Ryunosuke Kusaka: Chief of Staff of the Combined Fleet
Nobutake Kondō: Chief of Staff of the Combined Fleet

Commander of First Naval Fleet
Mitsumasa Yonai: Commander of First Naval Fleet
Chuichi Nagumo: Commander of First Naval Fleet
Isoroku Yamamoto: Commander of First Naval Fleet

Commander of 2nd Naval Fleet
Mitsumasa Yonai: Commander of 2nd Naval Fleet
Nobutake Kondō: Commander of 2nd Naval Fleet
Mineichi Koga: Commander of 2nd Naval Fleet

Commander of 3rd Naval Fleet
Mitsumasa Yonai: Commander of 3rd Naval Fleet

First Naval Air Fleet
Chuichi Nagumo: Commander of the First Naval Air Fleet
Kiyohide Shima: Commander of the First Naval Air Fleet
Kinpei Teraoka: Commander of the First Naval Air Fleet
Takijiro Ohnishi: Commander of the First Naval Air Fleet

Senior Staff Officer of the First Naval Air Fleet
Tamotsu Oishi: Senior Staff Officer of the First Naval Air Fleet

Second Navy Air Fleet
Shigeru Fukudome: Commander of the Second Navy Air Fleet

Fifth Navy Air Fleet
Matome Ugaki: Commander of the Fifth Navy Air Fleet

11th Navy Air Fleet
Nishizō Tsukahara: Commander of the 11th Navy Air Fleet
Jinichi Kusaka: Commander of 11th Navy Air Fleet

26th Air Flotilla
Masafumi Arima: Commander of the 26th Air Flotilla

Fourth Naval Fleet
Shigeyoshi Inouye: Commander of Fourth Navy Fleet

Eighth Naval Fleet
Gunichi Mikawa: Commander of Eighth Naval Fleet
Sentaro Omori: Commander of Eighth Naval Fleet

Third Destroyer Flotilla
Matsuji Ijuin: Commander of Third Destroyer Flotilla

China Navy Area Fleet
Shigetarō Shimada: Commander, China Area Fleet

1st Carrier Division
Chuichi Nagumo: Commander of 1st CarDiv
Tamotsu Oishi: Senior staff officer in the 1st Carrier Division

Carrier Division Three
Sueo Obayashi: Commander of CarDiv Three
Tamon Yamaguchi: Commander of 3rd CarDiv

1st CarDiv
Chuichi Hara: Commander of 1st CarDiv
Tamon Yamaguchi: Commander of 1st CarDiv

2nd Carrier Unit
Kakuji Kakuta: Commander of 2nd Carrier Unit

3rd Destroyer Flotilla
Shintaro Hashimoto: Commander of 3rd Destroyer Flotilla
Matsuji Ijuin: Commander of 3rd Destroyer Flotilla

2nd Destroyer Group
Tameichi Hara: Commander of 2nd Destroyer Group

10th Destroyer Flotilla
Susumu Kimura: Commander of 10th Destroyer Flotilla

10th Destroyer Unit
Susumu Kimura: Commander of 10th Destroyer Unit

22nd Destroyer Division
Rear Admiral Shima: Commander of 22nd Destroyer Division

6th Destroyer Flotilla
Sadamichi Kajioka: Commander of 6th Destroyer Flotilla

2nd Destroyer Unit
Raizo Tanaka: Commander of 2nd Destroyer Unit "Tokyo Express"

3rd Destroyer Flotilla
Shintaro Hashimoto: Commander of 3rd Destroyer Flotilla

4th Destroyer Division
Kosaku Aruga: Commander of 4th Destroyer Division

4th Destroyer Flotilla
Tamotsu Takama: Commander of 4th Destroyer Flotilla

5th Cruiser Division
Takeo Takagi: Commander of 5th Cruiser Division
Aritomo Goto: Commander of 5th Cruiser Division

18th Cruiser Division
Rear Admiral Marushige: Commander of 18th Cruiser Division

8th Cruiser Division
Hiroaki Abe: Commander of 8th Cruiser Division
Tadaichi Hara: Commander of 8th Cruiser Division

6th Cruiser Division
Aritomo Goto: Commander of 6th Cruiser Division

4th Cruiser Division (1st section)
Nobutake Kondō: Commander of 4th Cruiser Division

5th Cruiser Division
Takeo Takagi: Commander of 5th Cruiser Division 
Sentaro Omori: Commander of 5th Cruiser Division

7th Cruiser Division
Takeo Kurita: Commander of 7th Cruiser Division
Shoji Nishimura: Commander of 7th Cruiser Division

1st Battleship Division
Isoroku Yamamoto: Commander of 1st Battleship Division

3rd Battleship Division (1st section)
Gunichi Mikawa: Commander of 3rd Battleship Division

3rd Submarine Sqdn
Teruhisa Komatsu: Commander of 3rd Submarine Sqdn

5th Submarine Sqdn
Daigo Tadashige: Commander of 5th Submarine Sqdn

13th Submarine Sqdn
Takeharu Miyazaki: Commander of 13th Submarine Sqdn

First Submarine Fleet
Tatsunosuke Ariizumi: Commander of First Submarine Fleet

Sixth Submarine Fleet
Daigo Tadashige: Commander of Sixth Submarine Fleet

1st Transport Group
Kunizo Kanaoka: Commander of 1st Transport Group

2nd Transport Group
Shigoroku Nakayama: Commander of 2nd Transport Group

3rd Transport Group
Raizo Tanaka: Commander of 3rd Transport Group

Seaplane Tender Group
Riutaro Fujita: Commander of Seaplane Tender Group

Minesweeper Group
Sadatomo Miyamoto: Commander of Minesweeper Group

First Naval Striking Force
Takeo Kurita: Commander of First Naval Striking Force (Battle of Leyte Gulf, Philippines Campaign)

Officer in Japanese Vessel Raiders Force(1941-42)
Tamotsu Oishi: He assigned the lead of Aikoku Maru, unit in Japanese Vessel Raiders Force during the Navy Raiding campaign in the Indian Seas area.
See List of Japanese Auxiliary Cruiser Commerce Raiders

Sasebo 7th Special Naval Landing Force
Takeo Sugai: Commander of Sasebo 7th Special Naval Landing Force

Chief of Staff of the Maizuru Naval Base
Sokichi Takagi: chief of staff of the Maizuru Naval Base
Kiyohide Shima: chief of Staff of the Maizuru Naval District

First Naval District
Michitaro Totsuka: Commander of the First Naval District

Kure and Yokosuka Naval Districts
Shigetarō Shimada: Commandant, Yokosuka and Kure Naval Districts
Mitsumasa Yonai: commanded Yokosuka Naval District

Sasebo Naval District
Mitsumasa Yonai: commanded Sasebo Naval District

Sasebo Naval Yard
Nobuzo Tohmatsu: commanded Sasebo Naval Yard

Yokosuka Naval Base
Soemu Toyoda: Commander of the Yokosuka Naval Base

Kure Naval Base
Ibō Takahashi: Commander of the Kure Naval Base

Chinkai Naval Station (Chosen)
Mitsumasa Yonai: Vice-Admiral, commanded Chinkai Naval Station (Chosen)

Ryojun Naval Station (Kwantung)
H.Ukita: Vice-Admiral, commanded Ryojun Naval Station (Kwantung)

Central Government Ministries

Kodoha ideological advisers in government
Sadao Araki
Hideki Tōjō
Koiso Kuniaki
Jinsaburo Mazaki
Heisuke Yanagawa
Hideyoshi Obata
Kazushige Ugaki
Hajime Sugiyama
Yoshijirō Umezu
Tetsuzan Nagata

Chief of Cabinet Secretary
Naoki Hoshino: Chief of Cabinet Secretary

Welfare Minister;)
Kōichi Kido: Education, Welfare and Home Minister, as well as chief secretary to the Naidaijin and last proper Naidaijin (Lord Keeper of the Privy Seal). He is recognised as one of the principal supporters of General Tojo's policies. During his period as Home Affairs Minister, he commanded the Keishicho (Tokyo Metropolitan Police Department), and national civil police forces.

Minister of Education
Sadao Araki: charge of Minister of Education; Company Commander, 1st Infantry Regiment, Imperial Guard Division, during the Russo-Japanese War; principal nationalist thinker and right-wing political adviser in the country; War minister; founder of Kokuhonsha (Society for the Foundation of the State) right-wing secret society
Hideki Tōjō: Minister of Education
Kōichi Kido: concurrently Minister of Education

Imperial Youth Federation/Imperial Youth Corps
Kingoro Hashimoto: Imperial Youth Federation and Imperial Youth Corps Chief; in charge of young nationalist and militarists local indoctrination, following official doctrines amongst Minister of Education policies.

Minister of State Affairs
Heisuke Yanagawa: Minister of State Affairs

Finance Minister
Okinori Kaya: Finance Minister, also opium dealer to the Chinese and government supporter
Kazuo Aoki: Finance Minister
Ikeda Shigeaki Minister of Finance.
Masatsune Ogura: Finance Minister (with Sumitomo Clan Links)
Seihin Ikeda: Ex-Finance Minister, also political adviser (other figure of Zaibatsu groups in government)

Government Finances and Economics Entities

'National Economic policies'
Naoki Hoshino: Political Adviser charged with composing new economic policies, and Chief of Economic Project Department and Chief of Cabinet Secretary

'Planning Bureau in Cabinet Resources Board'
Isamu Yokoyama: Chief of Planning Bureau in Cabinet Resources Board

'Member in Cabinet Research Board'
Teiichi Suzuki: concurrently Member, Cabinet Research Board,

'Imperial Planning Institute'
Takazo Numata: Head of 1st Department, Planning Institute

'1st Department, Planning Institute (Cabinet Research Board Unit)'
Takazo Numata:Chief of 1st Department, Planning Institute Unit, inside of Cabinet Research Board

'Cabinet Planning Board'
Sumihisa Ikeda: President of Cabinet Planning Board
Kenryo Sato: President of Central Government Cabinet Planning Board for sometimes
Teiichi Suzuki: President of the Cabinet Planning Board, Minister of State (Without Portfolio); also providing guidance for Wang Ching-wei's new regime at Nanking, also Imperial nominee to the House of Peers

'First Bureau, Cabinet Planning Board'
Isamu Yokoyama: Chief of First Bureau, Cabinet Planning Board

'General Affairs Bureau, Cabinet Planning Board'
Isamu Yokoyama: Chief of General Affairs Bureau, Cabinet Planning Board

'Secretary-General of the Asia Development Board'
Teiichi Suzuki: Secretary-General of the Asia Development Board

'Political Affairs Section of the Asia Development Board'
Teiichi Suzuki: first Chief of the Political Affairs Section of the Asia Development Board (China Affairs Board)
Heisuke Yanagawa: Chief of Political Affairs Section of the Asia Development Board

Commerce and Industry Minister
Ichizō Kobayashi: Commerce and Industry Ministry (also chairman of Tokyo Gasu Denky); ardent follower of Hitler´s doctrines
Seizo Sakonji: Commerce and Industry Minister (Army figure in government)
Teijirō Toyoda: Commerce and Industry, Foreign Affairs Minister and Marine Minister, (with Mitsui Clan connection)
Hideki Tōjō: Minister of Commerce and Industry
Ikeda Shigeaki: Minister of Commerce and Industry
Nobusuke Kishi: Minister of Commerce and Industry

Government Industry, Commerce and Trading Organizations

'Nan-yo Kyokai'
Fujiyama Raita: Vice-president of "Nan-yo Kyokai" (South Seas Society), as government-Navy Trade Agency in South Seas Mandate

'Nanyo Sangyo Kaisha'
Masaichi Hanaoka Directing Manager of Nanyo Sangyo Kaisha in Tokyo, Japan

'Nanyo Kohatsu Kaisha'
Haruji Matsue Directing-Manager of  Nanyo Kohatsu Kabushiki Kaisha (South Seas Developing Company)

Minister of Trade
Hideki Tōjō: Minister of Trade

Minister of State (without portfolio)
Teiichi Suzuki: Minister of State (Without portfolio) in central government
Kasiburo Ando:  Minister of State without Portfolio
Hiranuma Kiichirō: Minister of State without Portfolio
Toji Yasui: Minister of State without Portfolio

Minister of Agriculture
Yoriyasu Arima: Leader in Imperial Farmers Association, political adviser, later Minister of Agriculture

Communications Minister
Shōzō Murata: Communications Minister (president of Osaka Shosen Kaisha Company, insider of Sumitomo Clan)
Nobofumi Ito: Chief of Information Department
Koh Ishii: Ex servant in Foreign Affairs Ministry; was Official Government spokesman
'Official Journalists'
Teiichi Muto: Official Journalist in Asahi Shimbun and Japan Times and Advertiser
Shiro Mashida: Official journalist in Asahi Shimbun
Masanori Ito: Official Journalist and Director in Japan Times and Mail
Akinaru Jisawa: Official journalist in Chungai Shogyo
'Support writers and military experts'
Yasuo Mishina: Military strategist
Tadashi Saito: Army expert
Otsughi Narita: Military thinker
Kinoaki Matsuo: Navy Theoretician
'Official war correspondent'
Eiji Suzuki: a war correspondent for Yomiuri Shimbun in wartimes

President of International Cultural Relations Society
Aisuke Kabayama: President of International Cultural relations Society

Justice Minister
Akira Kazami: Justice Minister, Fumimaro Konoye partner, led the Keishicho (Tokyo Metropolitan Police Department)
Heisuke Yanagawa: Justice Minister; commander of the Keishicho (Tokyo Metropolitan Police Department), and leader in Taisei Yokusankai (Imperial Rule Assistance Association) group
Hiranuma Kiichirō: Minister of Justice for sometimes

Home Affairs Minister
Takejiro Tokonami: Home Affairs Minister; founder of Kokusui-kai, one of Yakuza organization.
Kiichiro Hiranuma: Prime Minister, with Japanese Navy support; also Home Affairs Minister; also chief of the Keishicho (Tokyo Metropolitan Police Department), also founder and leader in the "Shintoist Rites Research Council" organization
Saburo Ando: Home Affairs Minister
Hideki Tōjō: Home Affairs Minister
Kōichi Kido: Home Affairs Minister
Tsuneo Matsudaira: Home Affairs Minister

Diet members
Kishi Nobusuke: was a Diet member who co-signed the declaration of war against the United States
Chikao Fujisawa: Member of Diet (Parliament), supporter of State Shinto
Kingoro Hashimoto: Right-wing ideologist, also Imperial Youth Federation and Imperial Youth Corps leader; in charge of young nationalist and militarists local indoctrination, member of House of Representatives of Japan and vice-president of Diet; instigator of the Second Sino-Japanese War.

Foreign Affairs

Foreign Affairs Minister
Nobuyuki Abe: Foreign Affair Minister
Kijuro Shidehara Foreign Affairs Minister
Hideki Tōjō: concurrently Minister of Foreign Affairs
Aoki Shūzō: Foreign Minister
Shigemitsu Mamoru: Foreign Minister
Teijirō Toyoda: Foreign Minister
Kenkichi Yoshizawa: Minister of Foreign Affairs
Yosuke Matsuoka: Foreign Affairs Minister
Hachiro Arita: Foreign Affairs Minister, believer in the Axis Powers alliance
Shigenori Tōgō: Foreign Affairs Minister
Kichisaburō Nomura: Foreign Affairs Minister, also Japanese Ambassador in United States

Foreign Affairs Officers
Kanji Kato: High-ranking official in Foreign Affairs Ministry
Kaoru Muramatsu: Official of the Research Section of  Ministry of Foreign Affairs
Kinoaki Matsuo: Foreign Affairs officer, also intelligence unit when serving as liaison between the Japanese Foreign Office and the Admiralty; a Black Dragon Society member
Mr.Yosano: Foreign Office high-ranking official;as liaison in IGHQ-Army/Navy Intelligence section.
Tomohiko Ushiba: Foreign Office high-ranking official
Toshikazu Kase: Foreign Ministry high-ranking official
Ishiguro Shiro: Foreign Ministry high-ranking official, and Civil Government expert in Jews Affairs in wartimes

Foreign Affairs Officers on Diplomatic Missions
Ichizō Kobayashi: Industrialist and Government supporter in Diplomatic Mission to Ducht Indies (1940)
Yatsuji Nagai: Army attaché and Diplomatic in Matsuoka's mission to Europe and Russia
Hideo Iwakuro: Army attaché and Foreign Affairs officer, provided diplomatic support to the Washington mission
Kaname Wakasugi: special aide to Nomura Mission to Washington
Saburō Kurusu: special ambassador in diplomatic mission to Washington

Overseas ambassadors
Nobuyuki Abe: Ambassador to Nanking-China
Kichisaburō Nomura: Foreign Affairs Minister, also Japanese Ambassador in United States
Nabeshima Naohiro: a one-time Japanese ambassador to Italy
Toshio Shiratoru: Foreign Affairs Minister; Japanese Ambassador to Italy, diplomatic advisor and firm supporter of the Axis Powers alliance
Shigeru Yoshida: Japanese ambassador in Italy and England
Hiroshi Ōshima: Japanese Ambassador to Germany, also right-wing follower and military attaché working for alliance between Japan and Nazi Germany (Anti-Comintern Pact, 1937; Tripartite Alliance, 1940)
Renzo Sawada: Japanese Ambassador in France for some time
Naotake Satō: wartime Japanese Ambassador to the U.S.S.R.
Kenkichi Yoshizawa: Official Japanese Ambassador in Peiping (until 1937) and French Indochina in 1940-41
Yakichiro Suma: Japan's Ambassador in Spain
Morito Morishima: Japanese Ambassador in Portugal
Mamoru Shinozaki: Diplomat Officer, Japanese Embassy in British Malaya
Jirō Minami: Kwantung Army - concurrently Ambassador to Manchukuo
Taka Hishikari: Kwantung Army - Ambassador to Manchukuo
Kumataro Honda: Japanese Ambassador in Nanjing during Wang Jingwei administration
Ryonosuke Seita: Japanese Diplomatic Officer in Brisbane, Australia
Gen Debuchi Special Envoy to diplomatic mission to Australia

Military attachés in foreign service
See: Japanese military attachés in foreign service

Japanese Overseas Consul-Generals
Mr.Loxton was European Honorary-Consul at Japanese service in Brisbane
Kojiro Inoue Japanese Consul-General in Sydney
Matatoshi Saito: Japanese Consul-General in Batavia (before 1941)
Yutaka Ishizawa: Japanese Consul-General in Batavia
Mr.Kita: Japanese Consul-General in Honolulu
Chiune Sugihara: Japanese Consul-General in Kovno, Lithuania

Japanese Overseas Affairs Minister
Koiso Kuniaki: Ministry of Greater East Asia (Japan)
Kazuo Aoki: Ministry of Greater East Asia (Japan)
Shigenori Tōgō: Minister for Colonization, later the Ministry of Greater East Asia (Japan)

Political Affairs Section of the Asia Development Board
Teiichi Suzuki: Chief of the Political Affairs Section of the Asia Development Board (China Affairs Board), Secretary-General of the Asia Development Board

Governor-General in Exterior Provinces (1944-45)
Nobuyuki Abe: Governor-General of Chosen (Korea)
Otozō Yamada: Governor-General of Kwantung Leased Territory
Toshio Otsu: Governor-General of Karafuto (Sakhalin)
Rikichi Andō: Governor-General of Taiwan (Formosa)
Boshirō Hosogaya: Governor-General of South Seas Mandate (Micronesia)

Tibetan Department (1942)
Japanese and foreign politician and military experts related to Buddhist and Tibetan topics group inside of foreign affairs ministry during 1942, for research the possibility of any operations or incursion in Tibet:

Aoki Bunkyo
Lt.col Ishiwara Kanji
Lt.Nomoto Jinzo
Goshima Tokujiro
Yamaji Yasujiro
Tsarong Shape
Regent Reting
Anchin Hultukhu
Dilowa Hutukhu

Japanese experts in Jewish Affairs (1938-42)

Military and Civil experts (Jewish & Manchurian Think Tank Groups)
Captain Inuzuka Koreshige: Japanese Imperial Navy's Advisory Bureau on Jewish Affairs from March 1939 until April 1942.
Colonel Yasue Norihiro: Army expert in Jewish topics and anti-Semitic ideology, believing strongly in the Protocols of the Elders of Zion.
Ishiguro Shiro: Foreign Ministry high-ranking official
Setsuzo Kotsuji:Government Officer, the only Japanese in the world at the time to speak and read Hebrew.
Lieutenant-Colonel Ishiwara Kanji
Colonel Seishirō Itagaki
Industrialist Yoshisuke Aikawa
Japanese Consul in Kovno, Lithuania, Chiune Sugihara
General Kiichiro Higuchi: Japanese Army contact with Manchu Jew anticommunist movement and its supporter.

East Jew leader and Japanese supporter in Manchukuo
Abraham Kaufman: Manchu Jew leader, founder of Far Eastern Jewish Council and Betarim Jew Zionists Movement.

1938 Five Minister Conference
At the 1938 Five Ministers' Conference, five of the most powerful men in Japan gathered to discuss the ideas and plans of their 'Jewish experts'.
Prime Minister Prince Fumimaro Konoye
Foreign Minister Hachirō Arita
Army Minister Seishirō Itagaki
Naval Minister Yonai Mitsumasa
Minister of Finance, Commerce, and Industry Ikeda Shigeaki

German Liaison in Jewish topics (until 1942)
Colonel Josef Meisinger: chief of the Gestapo, was the Nazi liaison with Japanese military and government on the Jewish question.
Dr. Franz Joseph Spahn: leader-designee and political adviser of the NSDAP (Nazi) party in Japan in that period.

Government Supporters

Other close military government collaborators
Hiroshi Akita
Seizo Arisue
Isamu Chō
Gun Hashimoto
Saburo Hayashi
Masao Inaba
Seijun Inada
Akiho Ishii
Susumu Nishiura
Tokutaro Sakurai
Kōtoku Satō
Mitsuru Ushijima
Masao Watanabe
Hiromichi Yahara
Yasuyo Yamazaki

Ultra-nationalist supporters close to the government
Prince Kan'in Kotohito: ultra-nationalist and State Shinto supporter; later he was sent to Southeast Asia, in order to convey the Imperial message concerning the cessation of hostilities.
Prince Asaka Yasuhiko: Right-wing partisan, also involved in the Rape of Nanking, with Tenno direct orders to supervise operations along General Kesago Nakajima, one of Operative Commanders in area; later returned to China in order to convey the Imperial Message concerning the cessation of hostilities.
Prince Takeda Tsuneyoshi: Nationalist follower; possibly was chief of Japanese Secret Services in Manchukuo, coordinated military and civil actions. Had a direct link with Imperial Family. Later sent to Manchukuo, with orders to convey the Imperial Message concerning the cessation of hostilities, but decided instead to take action against Soviet forces in the area.
Prince Fushimi Hiroyasu: Right-winger, representative of the Emperor at High Command Conferences, also Chief of Naval General Staff of the Imperial Navy forces
Yoshio Kodama: Right-wing industrialist, yakuza chief and honorary Rear Admiral, supporter of right-wing government policies
Ryoichi Sasakawa: Another right-wing follower, and fascist thinker
Nobuyuki Abe: Ex-Prime Minister, Governor-General of Chosen and political advisor
Mitsuru Toyama: Founder of right-wing publishing firm Genyōsha and lator Black Dragon Society, also political advisor of Greater Japan Patriotic Society,  yakuza organization.
Tokutaro Kimura: Ex-Chief of Greater Japan Martial Virtue Society, kendo section, also ex-Chief of Imperial Japan Bar Association.

Nobility members, entrepreneurs and other supporters of Government and military establishment

Nobility members
Count Kabayama Aisuke
Count Hisaichi Terauchi
Count Hiranuma Kiichirō
Count Yoriyasu Arima
Viscount Kazumoto Machijiri
Viscount Kintomo Mushanokōji
Baron Kōki Hirota
Baron Tomoshige Samejima
Baron Yoshitoshi Tokugawa
Baron Mineo Ōsumi
Baron Yoshimichi Hara
Baron Sadao Araki
Baron Shigeru Honjō
Baron Takeji Nara
Baron Nobuyoshi Mutō
Baron Takeichi Nishi
Marquis Kōichi Kido
Marquis Daigo Tadashige
Marquis Teruhisa Komatsu
Marquis Ōkuma Shigenobu

Entrepreneurs
Seihin Ikeda
Ichizō Kobayashi: (President of Tokyo Gasu Denky and Hitachi group representative)
Shōzō Murata: (President of Osaka Shosen Kaisha;as Sumitomo figure)
Masatsune Ogura: (Sumitomo representative)
Teijirō Toyoda: (representative of the Japanese Navy and Mitsui group)
Yoshisuke Aikawa: (Representative of Nissan group)
Fuji Fujisawa
Noburu Ohtani: (President of N.Y.K. and Mitsubishi figure)
Fujiyama Raita:Private businessman with Japanese Navy links in South Seas Mandate
Kijirō Nambu:he was founded and led Nambu Arms Manufacturing Company during wartime

Other supporters
Teiichi Muto: Government journalist in Asahi Shimbun and Japan Time and Advertiser Official News
Toshio Shiratoru: Adviser in Foreign Affairs ministry, also heavy believer of Axis Powers alliance and Overseas Ambassador
Yakichiro Suma: Spokesman in Foreign Affairs ministry; later official overseas Ambassador.
Koh Ishii: Ex servant in Foreign Affairs Ministry and official Government spokesman
Shūmei Ōkawa: Ultranationalist and fascist thinker, believer in government and military policies
Akira Kazami: Konoye political partidaire and Justice Minister
Fumio Gotō: Konoye political partner; also another fascist ideologist, supporter of Militarists
Naoki Hoshino: Right-wing and Army follower charged to compose the economic policies of Manchukuo and Japan.

Notes

References 
 

Government and military commanders
World War II Government and military commanders
Government and military commanders